The  Cleveland Gladiators season was the 18th season for the franchise in the Arena Football League, and their eighth in Cleveland. The Gladiators played at the Quicken Loans Arena. The Gladiators drew an average home attendance of 10,173 in the 2017 AFL season.

Staff

Roster

Schedule

Regular season
The 2017 regular season schedule was released on January 5, 2017.

Playoffs

Standings

References

Cleveland Gladiators
Cleveland Gladiators seasons
Cleveland Gladiators